John Bailar may refer to:

 John C. Bailar Jr. (1904–1991), American chemist
 John C. Bailar III (1932–2016), American biostatistician